Kauguri is a neighbourhood of Jūrmala city, Latvia.

References

External links 

Neighbourhoods in Jūrmala